Osagie Emmanuel Ehanire  (born 4 November 1945) is a Nigerian medical doctor and politician. He was appointed Minister of Health in President Muhammadu Buhari administration in November 2019. Following the submission of the ministerial nominees to the Senate by the Presidency in July 2019 and subsequent screening, He was appointed as the Minister of Health in August 2019.

Early life 
Ehanire was born on 4 November 1946 in Warri Town, Warri South Local Government Area of Delta State

Education 
After his primary education, Ehanire attended Government College Ibadan in Oyo State for his West African School Certificate where he excelled at his Higher School Certificate examination. Ehanire went on to study Medicine at Ludwig Maximilian University of Munich in Germany, qualifying as a Surgeon. He went on to the Teaching Hospital of the University of Duisburg and Essen and to the BG Accident Hospital in Duisburg, Germany for his post graduate education. In 1976, he attended the Royal College of Surgeons in Ireland where he obtained a postgraduate Diploma in Anaesthetics. He got his Board Certification in both General Surgery and Orthopaedic Trauma Surgery at the Medical Board of North Rhine Westphalia in Dusseldorf, Germany. In 1984, he became a Fellow of West African College of Surgeons.

Career 
Ehanire worked in Germany as a Resident Anesthesiologist, Resident Vascular Surgeon and Resident General Surgeon in Thoracic Surgery at various hospitals. He also served as Clinical Instructor, Fracture Internal Fixation Course at BG Accident Hospital in Duisburg, Germany. On his return to Nigeria in 1982, he worked at the University of Benin Teaching Hospital as Senior Registrar in the Department of Surgery (Orthopaedic Surgery), a position he held until 1984. Between 1985 and 1990, he joined the Shell Petroleum Development Company Hospital as a Divisional Consultant Surgeon. He also served at various times on the Medical Review Board of Edo State Hospital Management Board and remains as a Trustee of TY Danjuma Foundation.

Politics 
Ehanire was appointed as a delegate of Congress for Progressive Change (CPC) to the political merger conference that gave birth to the All Progressive Congress (APC), the name which he coined. As the Edo State Coordinator for the Buhari Support Organisation (BSO), he was a key player in ensuring the victory of President Muhammadu Buhari at the 2015 presidential election. In October 2015, he made the list of ministerial nominees to serve the Buhari led administration. After being screened and cleared by the National Assembly, he was appointed as the Minister of State for Health in November 2015.

Following the beginning of a new administration in May 2019 and the submission of the ministerial nominees to the Senate by the Presidency in July 2019 and subsequent screening, Ehanire was appointed the Minister of Health in August 2019.

Other activities
 Partnership for Maternal, Newborn & Child Health (PMNCH), Member of the Board

Personal life
He is married with children.

Award
In October 2022, a Nigerian national honour of Commander of the Order of the Niger (CON) was conferred on him by President Muhammadu Buhari.

See also
Cabinet of Nigeria

References

1946 births
Nigerian anesthesiologists
Living people
Health ministers of Nigeria
Nigerian surgeons
People from Warri
Nigerian politicians